In theoretical physics, -form electrodynamics is a generalization of Maxwell's theory of electromagnetism.

Ordinary (via. one-form) Abelian electrodynamics
We have a one-form , a gauge symmetry

where  is the Hodge star operator.

Alternatively, we may express  as a closed -form, but we do not consider that case here.

 is a gauge-invariant 2-form defined as the exterior derivative .

 satisfies the equation of motion

(this equation obviously implies the continuity equation).

This can be derived from the action

where  is the spacetime manifold.

p-form Abelian electrodynamics
We have a -form , a gauge symmetry

where  is the Hodge star operator.

Alternatively, we may express  as a closed -form.

 is a gauge-invariant -form defined as the exterior derivative .

 satisfies the equation of motion

(this equation obviously implies the continuity equation).

This can be derived from the action

where  is the spacetime manifold.

Other sign conventions do exist.

In 11-dimensional supergravity or M-theory, we have a 3-form electrodynamics.

Non-abelian generalization
Just as we have non-abelian generalizations of electrodynamics, leading to Yang–Mills theories, we also have nonabelian generalizations of -form electrodynamics. They typically require the use of gerbes.

References
 Henneaux; Teitelboim (1986), "-Form electrodynamics", Foundations of Physics 16 (7): 593-617, 

 Navarro; Sancho (2012), "Energy and electromagnetism of a differential -form ", J. Math. Phys. 53, 102501 (2012) 

Electrodynamics
String theory